The nerve of the pterygoid canal (Vidian nerve) is formed by the junction of the greater petrosal nerve and deep petrosal nerve, which passes from the foramen lacerum to the pterygopalatine fossa through the pterygoid canal.

Structure 
The nerve of the pterygoid canal forms from the junction of the greater petrosal nerve and the deep petrosal nerve within the foreamen lacerum. This combined nerve exits the foramen lacerum and travels to the pterygopalatine fossa through the pterygoid canal in the sphenoid.

The nerve of the pterygoid canal contains axons of both sympathetic and parasympathetic axons, specifically;

preganglonic parasympathetic axons from the greater petrosal nerve, a branch of the facial nerve (cell bodies are located in the superior salivatory nucleus)
postganglionic sympathetic axons from the deep petrosal nerve, a branch of the internal carotid plexus (cell bodies are located in the superior cervical ganglion)

Function
The preganglionic parasympathetic axons synapse in the pterygopalatine ganglion, which contains the postganglionic neurons which provide secretomotor innervation to the lacrimal gland, as well as the nasal and palatine glands. 

The postganglionic sympathetic axons do not synapse in the pterygopalatine ganglion, they travel on the branches of the maxillary nerve to provide sympathetic innervation to blood vessels.

Additional images

See also
 Vidus Vidius

References

External links
  ("NPC")

Nerves of the head and neck
Facial nerve